Epipocus is a genus of handsome fungus beetles in the family Endomychidae. There are at least 20 described species in Epipocus.

Species
These 21 species belong to the genus Epipocus:

References

Further reading

 
 
 
 
 
 
 

Endomychidae
Coccinelloidea genera